Leighton Williams (born 23 February 1977), is a Welsh chess International Master (IM) (2002), three-times Welsh Chess Championship winner (2000, 2005, 2008), Chess Olympiad individual gold medalist (1994). He is the 3rd best Welsh player.

Biography
Leighton Williams three times won Welsh Chess Championships: 2000, 2005, and 2008. He three times played for Welsh Chess Club Nidum Liberals in European Men's Chess Club Cup (1996-1998).

Leighton Williams played for Wales in the Chess Olympiads:
 In 1994, at first reserve board in the 31st Chess Olympiad in Moscow (+6, =0, -1) and won individual silver medal,
 In 1996, at second reserve board in the 32nd Chess Olympiad in Yerevan (+3, =2, -3),
 In 2000, at first board in the 34th Chess Olympiad in Istanbul (+2, =3, -6),
 In 2002, at first board in the 35th Chess Olympiad in Bled (+7, =4, -2),
 In 2004, at first board in the 36th Chess Olympiad in Calvià (+2, =2, -6),
 In 2006, at first board in the 37th Chess Olympiad in Turin (+6, =1, -2).

In 2002, he was awarded the FIDE International Master (IM) title.

References

External links

Leighton Williams chess games at 365chess.com

1977 births
Living people
Welsh chess players
Chess International Masters
Chess Olympiad competitors